Thomas Roland Matte (June 14, 1939November 2, 2021) was an American professional football player who was a running back in the National Football League (NFL) in the 1960s and 1970s and earned a Super Bowl ring.  He attended Shaw High School in East Cleveland and was an Eagle Scout.  Matte was an All-American quarterback playing college football at Ohio State University.

College career
Matte played quarterback but was more known for his rushing skills than passing prowess. For his senior  year, he finished 7th in voting for the Heisman Trophy (awarded to halfback Joe Bellino of Navy), finishing under future stars such as Billy Kilmer and Mike Ditka.

Professional playing career
Matte, nicknamed "Garbage Can", spent his 12-year pro career with the Baltimore Colts where he posted career stats of 4,646 rushing yards, 249 receptions for 2,869 yards, 1,367 yards returning kickoffs, and 57 touchdowns (45 rushing, 12 receiving). Late in the 1965 season, Matte also memorably filled in as an emergency quarterback when Colts QBs Johnny Unitas and Gary Cuozzo went down with season-ending injuries in consecutive home losses to the Chicago Bears and Green Bay Packers, respectively. For the Colts' regular-season finale (a 20-17 win) against the Los Angeles Rams and the following weekend's one-game playoff at Green Bay (a 13-10 overtime loss), Colts head coach Don Shula put a list of plays on a wristband that Matte wore. The wristband is now on display at the Pro Football Hall of Fame.

Matte would bloom late in his career. In 1968, he earned his first Pro Bowl honor after rushing for 662 yards on 183 carries for nine touchdowns. He also caught 25 passes for 275 yards and a touchdown. That season, the Colts advanced all the way to the NFL Championship Game. While he did have a quiet game against the Minnesota Vikings in the first playoff game (a 24-14 win where he ran for 31 yards), he came alive in the 1968 NFL Championship Game. Avenging his prior quiet games, he rushed for 88 yards on 17 carries for three touchdowns to galvanize the Colts to a 34-0 victory over the Cleveland Browns, avenging their loss in the title game four years prior. It won Matte a cover on the January 6, 1969 cover of Sports Illustrated, taken after he had scored his third touchdown of the afternoon in the NFL Championship Game against the Cleveland Browns. The Colts were the winners of the penultimate NFL title game and advanced to Super Bowl III. Matte would rush for 116 yards on 11 carries while catching two passes for thirty yards; he set the record for highest per-carry rushing average in a Super Bowl game with 10.5, with his biggest run being a run of 58 yards that was stopped by his former teammate Johnny Sample. However, Matte would fail to reach the end zone and a fumble to start the second half only made the Colts more frustrated on their way to a 16-7 loss.  The following year was even better, as he rushed for a career high 909 yards on 235 carries with a league-high 11 touchdowns while adding 43 catches for 513 yards for two touchdowns. His total touches, yards from scrimmage (1,422) and touchdowns were all league highs.

Matte was injured in the first game of the 1970 season against the San Diego Chargers and therefore did not play when the Colts returned to Super Bowl V at the end of that season and beat the Dallas Cowboys. However, he was awarded a Super Bowl ring. Matte returned for one last fresh run with the 1971 season, playing in all 14 games and rushing for 607 yards on 173 carries for eight touchdowns while catching 29 passes for 239 yards. The Colts made a run at the AFC title game once again. Matte would have his last significant playtime with the game against Cleveland, rushing 16 times for 26 yards while catching three passes for 22 yards as the Colts won 20-3. In the AFC Championship versus the Miami Dolphins, he made just one catch for six yards as the Colts lost 21-0.

After spending most of the 1972 season on the practice squad, he was traded from the Colts to the Chargers for a 1973 eighth-round selection (189th overall–Ray Oldham) on January 24, 1973.

Following Unitas' lead, Matte and many of his Baltimore Colt teammates disowned the franchise after their move to Indianapolis in 1984.

Broadcasting career
Matte was a color analyst on CBS coverage of NFL games from 1976 to 1978. From 1996 to 2005, Matte teamed with Baltimore sportscaster Scott Garceau in broadcasting Baltimore Ravens games on local radio.

Death
Matte died on November 2, 2021, in Ruxton, Maryland, from complications of leukemia. He was 82.

References

1939 births
2021 deaths
Sportspeople from Pittsburgh
Players of American football from Pittsburgh
American football running backs
Ohio State Buckeyes football players
Baltimore Colts players
Western Conference Pro Bowl players
Baltimore Ravens announcers
National Football League announcers
United States Football League announcers
College football announcers